is a quasi-national park in Aomori Prefecture in the far northern Tōhoku region of Honshū in Japan. It is rated a protected landscape (category V) according to the IUCN. The park includes a number of discontinuous areas on Tsugaru Peninsula, including the volcanic peaks of Mount Iwaki, a portion of the primeval Siebold's beech forests of Shirakami-Sanchi UNESCO World Heritage Site, Cape Tappi, other coastal areas of northern Tsugaru Peninsula, and the wetlands of Juniko and Jusanko lakes and marshes.

The area was designated a quasi-national park on 31 March 1975. It spans the borders of the municipalities of Hirosaki, Goshogawara, Tsugaru, Imabetsu, Sotogahama, Ajigasawa, Fukaura, and Nakadomari.

Like all quasi-national parks in Japan, the park is managed by the local prefectural government, in this case, that of Aomori Prefecture.

See also

List of national parks of Japan

References
Sutherland, Mary and Britton, Dorothy. The National Parks of Japan. Kodansha International (1995).

External links
 Maps of Tsugaru Quasi-National Park

Parks and gardens in Aomori Prefecture
National parks of Japan
Protected areas established in 1975
1975 establishments in Japan
Hirosaki
Goshogawara
Tsugaru, Aomori
Imabetsu, Aomori
Sotogahama, Aomori
Ajigasawa, Aomori
Fukaura, Aomori
Nakadomari, Aomori